The Church of Saint Stephen the King is the oldest extant historical building located in Žilina, Slovakia.

References

External links

Churches in Žilina Region
Buildings and structures in Žilina
13th-century Roman Catholic church buildings in Slovakia
Romanesque architecture in Slovakia